"In the Margins" is a single by Echo & the Bunnymen that was released on 31 October 2005 in the UK and on 3 November 2005 in the US It was the second single to be released from the 2005 album, Siberia. It reached number 226 on the UK Singles Chart.

Like their previous single, "Stormy Weather", and the parent album, this single was produced by Hugh Jones who had previously produced the band's 1981 album Heaven Up Here. The cover photograph was taken by Joe Dilworth.

Guitarist magazine said the track reminded them of how the band were once, "sneeringly superior", peers to U2.

Track listings
"In the Margins" (radio edit) (Will Sergeant, Ian McCulloch) – 3:58
"Nothing Lasts Forever" (acoustic) (Sergeant, McCulloch, Les Pattinson) – 4:10
"In the Margins" (instrumental) (Sergeant, McCulloch) – 5:40

Personnel

Musicians
 Ian McCulloch – vocals, guitar
 Will Sergeant – lead guitar
 Peter Wilkinson – bass
 Paul Fleming – keyboards
 Simon Finley – drums

Production
 Hugh Jones – producer
 Joe Dilworth – photography

References

External links
Promotional video at the band's official website

2005 singles
Echo & the Bunnymen songs
Songs written by Ian McCulloch (singer)
Songs written by Will Sergeant
Song recordings produced by Hugh Jones (producer)